Paweł Blehm (born 17 April 1980 in Olkusz) is a Polish chess grandmaster (2001).

He took part in the FIDE World Chess Championship 2000, but was knocked out in the first round by Smbat Lputian. He played for Poland in the Chess Olympiad of 2000. In 2002 he won the Bermuda Open tournament.

His handle on the Internet Chess Club is "Pawelek".

References

External links
 

1980 births
Living people
Polish chess players
Chess grandmasters
Chess Olympiad competitors
People from Olkusz
Sportspeople from Lesser Poland Voivodeship